Teynham railway station is on the Chatham Main Line in England, serving the village of Teynham, Kent.

The station and all trains that call are operated by Southeastern.

On the London-bound platform, there is a staffed booking office which is open only at certain times, as well as a passenger-operated self-service ticket machine issuing permits to travel.

History

The original two-storey brick built station was demolished in the 1970s and replaced by the prefabricated buildings popular at the time.
A manually operated crossing to allow access to Station Row to the north of the line was finally replaced with automatic gates during the upgrading of signalling in December 2011.

Accidents and incidents
In December 1861, a passenger train was derailed due to elongation of the gap at a rail joint during cold weather.

Services
All services at Teynham are operated by Southeastern using  EMUs.

The typical off-peak service in trains per hour is:
 1 tph to 
 1 tph to  via 

References

External links

Railway stations in Swale
DfT Category E stations
Former London, Chatham and Dover Railway stations
Railway stations in Great Britain opened in 1858
Railway stations served by Southeastern